Mayow may refer to
Mayow Park in Sydenham, London, England
John Mayow (1641–1679), British chemist, physician, and physiologist 
William Mayow, 16th century major in Cornwall, England